Kirill Chernook (born 2 January 2003) is a Belarusian professional footballer who plays for Minsk.

References

External links 
 
 

2003 births
Living people
Sportspeople from Vitebsk Region
Belarusian footballers
Association football midfielders
FC Dynamo Brest players
FC Rukh Brest players
FC Minsk players